Norman Charles Henry Burtenshaw OBE (born February 1926) is an English former football referee, who officiated in the English Football League and was also on the FIFA list. During his time on the list he was based in Great Yarmouth, Norfolk. Outside of football he originally worked as a night telephonist before becoming a newsagent.

Career
Burtenshaw became a Football League referee in 1962, and achieved international status after only three seasons in 1965.

In 1967, he was knocked unconscious by incensed Millwall fans following their team's 2–1 defeat by Aston Villa at The Den.  
The FA dropped him from its list of referees' names submitted to FIFA in 1970. However, he had a strong season in 1970–71. Burtenshaw was given control of the 1971 FA Cup Final between Arsenal and Liverpool. Arsenal won 2–1 after extra time. At the end of the game Burtenshaw sank to the ground in celebration "pumping his fists towards the heavens". He later explained that he had been relieved that the game hadn't gone to a replay. When Arsenal beat Benfica 6–2 a few months later, Burtenshaw's performance upset the Benfica players so much, they mobbed him up at the end of the game.

He regained his international status at the start of the 1971/72 season. Burtenshaw took charge of the 1972 League Cup Final between Stoke City and Chelsea, and a European Cup semi-final second leg tie between Benfica and Ajax, which turned out to be the most senior European club appointment of his career.

He retired at the end of the 1972–73 season, one which coincidentally saw the début of another Football League, FA Cup and FIFA referee from the same home town of Great Yarmouth – Alf Grey.

He was appointed an Officer of the Order of the British Empire (OBE) in the 1974 New Year Honours.

He later became president of the Referees' Association.

References

Print

Football League Handbooks, 1962–1970
Rothmans Football Yearbooks, 1971–1973
Burtenshaw, Norman (1973) Whose Side Are You on Ref?, Sphere
Ionescu, Romeo (2003) The Complete Results & Line-Ups of the European Fairs Cup 1955–1971, Soccer Books Limited
Ionescu, Romeo (2004) The Complete Results & Line-Ups of the European Champions Clubs' Cup 1955–1991, Soccer Books Limited
Ionescu, Romeo (2004) The Complete Results & Line-Ups of the European Cup Winners Cup 1960–1999, Soccer Books Limited
Ionescu, Romeo (2004) The Complete Results & Line-Ups of the UEFA Cup 1971–1991, Soccer Books Limited

Internet

1926 births
Possibly living people
Sportspeople from Great Yarmouth
English football referees
English Football League referees
FA Cup Final referees
Officers of the Order of the British Empire